Calosima orthophrontis is a moth in the family Blastobasidae. It is found in Bolivia.

References

Moths described in 1932
orthrophrontis